W30EG-D is a low-powered television station that is licensed to and serving Knoxville, Tennessee. Owned by Ventana Television, the station is a Home Shopping Network affiliate that broadcasts a digital signal on UHF channel 30. The signal originates from a transmitter located near Sharp Ridge.

References

External links

30EG-D
Television channels and stations established in 2010
Low-power television stations in the United States
2010 establishments in Tennessee